The New York Senior Football Championship is a Gaelic football competition for teams affiliated to the New York (New York GAA) board of the Gaelic Athletic Association. Teams are generally from the New York area, though a team from Stamford, Connecticut, has participated in recent years, and in 2006 Four Provinces represented Philadelphia. In 2007 Na Clairsigh, a club from Albany, New York, joined the 32 football teams and four hurling teams in the NY GAA.

Roll of Honour

List of Finals

References

Senior Championship
Senior Championship
Gaelic 1 Championship